Jane Grey (born Mamie Larock; May 22, 1882—November 9, 1944) was an American stage and screen actress of the silent era.

Early life
Born in Vermont in 1882, Mamie (later Jane Grey) was the fifth child of seven children of Louisa May and Joseph Larock. The federal census of 1900 documents that her father, a native of Canada, was a "common day laborer" and that her Vermont-born mother washed other people's clothes to earn extra money to support the large family.

Stage and film
Grey started her Broadway career around 1911 and was the original female lead with John Barrymore in the popular 1914 stage play Kick In written by Willard Mack . Grey, who began appearing in films around 1913, was in Hassard Short's All-Star Shakespearean pageant for Actor's Equity in 1921, and she was also cast in a few French productions for Louis Feuillade in the early 1920s. Although her final film role was in 1927, she continued to perform on stage until 1935.

Personal life and death
Grey was married twice, to Ricardo Martin and then to William E. Tyrrel.

Filmography

The Paymaster's Son (1913) *short
The Adventures of a Girl Reporter (1914) *short
The Little Gray Lady (1914)
The Flaming Sword (1915)
The Right of Way (1915)
Let Katie Do It (1916)
Man and His Angel (1916)
The Waifs (1916)
 The Test (1916)
The Flower of Faith (1916)
 Her Fighting Chance (1917)
The Guilty Wife (1918)
The Birth of a Race (1918)
When My Ship Comes In (1919)
The Inner Ring (1919) *short
Le droit de tuer (1920)
L'orpheline (1921)
Parisette (1921)
The Governor's Lady (1923)
The Love Wager (1927)

References

External links

Jane Grey with John Barrymore in the 1915 play, Kick In

1882 births
1944 deaths
20th-century American actresses
American silent film actresses
Actresses from Vermont
People from Middlebury, Vermont
Burials at Kensico Cemetery